Petros A. Ioannou is a Cypriot American Electrical Engineer who made important contributions in Robust Adaptive Control, Vehicle and Traffic Flow Control, and Intelligent Transportation Systems.

Early life and education 
Petros A. Ioannou was born in the village of Tripimeni in Cyprus. After graduation from the Technical School of Nicosia and completion of his compulsory military service he moved to London, England in 1973 to attend University College London.  He graduated with First-class honours from University College London with a B.S. in mechanical engineering in 1978. He earned a M.S. in mechanical engineering and a Ph.D. in electrical engineering from the University of Illinois at Urbana–Champaign in the area of Robust Adaptive Control  under the supervision of doctoral advisor Petar V. Kokotovic.

Career 
Ioannou became an assistant professor at the University of Southern California in 1982 and was subsequently promoted to associate and full professor. He is currently a full professor in the Department of Electrical and Computer Engineering at the University of Southern California where he holds courtesy appointments in the Departments of Aerospace and Mechanical Engineering and Industrial and Systems Engineering. He is the holder of  the A.V. Balakrishnan Endowed Chair. He is the founder and director of the Center for Advanced Transportation Technologies and co-founder and associate director for research of the Metropolitan Transportation Center METRANS as well as the director of the Master Program on Financial Engineering. On February 09, 2022, he was elected as a member of the National Academy of Engineering (NAE) for his contributions to robust adaptive control and intelligent transportation systems for improved traffic flow and driver safety. In 2022, Ioannou was also elected to the Academia Europaea and to the National Academy of Inventors.

Research 
Ioannou’s multidisciplinary research focusses on solving problems related to automatic control with applications in the areas of vehicles, intelligent transportation systems, aircraft, computer disks servo control, noise and vibration cancellation and other applications. He is an expert in Robust Adaptive Control  and he is known for the use of σ-modification and switching σ-modification in establishing robustness in Adaptive control. He was one of the pioneers in making adaptive control practical by proposing robustness modifications that prevent instabilities and guarantee performance and robustness. He has been working on advanced vehicle concepts that involved drive by wire, steer by wire and later on cruise control and intelligent cruise control systems in collaboration with major automotive companies in the US. Intelligent cruise control systems also known as Adaptive Cruise Control (ACC)  systems allow automatic vehicle following with collision avoidance capabilities for safety and driver comfort in addition to positive environmental impact. He was the first to prove that ACC systems can be designed to guarantee stable vehicle following known as string stability without using vehicle to vehicle communication 
.

Ioannou’s research also involves the design of control systems for vibration control with applications to laser pointing devices, mechanical systems, noise cancellation devices  and disk drive servo control and camera image stabilization.

His research in the area of transportation involves traffic flow modeling and control as well as freight optimum routing and port automation. The development of a traffic simulation of the road network that feeds into  Los Angeles International Airport allows the evaluation of different technologies and concepts that influence the traffic around the terminals.

Awards 
 1984 – George Axelby Best Paper Award 
 1985 – NSF Presidential Young Investigator Award
 1992 – Fellow of the Institute of Electrical and Electronics Engineers
 2006 – Fellow of the International Federation of Automatic Control
 2008 – IEEE ITS Outstanding Application Award 
 2009 – Institution of Engineering and Technology (IET) Heaviside Medal for Achievement in Control  
 2016 – IEEE Transportation Technologies Award
 2016 – Recipient of the Viterbi School of Engineering Senior Research Award, University of Southern California
 2019 – Recipient Viterbi School of Engineering User-Inspired Research Award, University of Southern California

Books

Publications (selected)
M. Polycarpou and P. Ioannou, “A Robust Adaptive Nonlinear Control Design” Automatica, Vol. 32, No. 3, pp. 423–427, March 1996.
H. Xu, M. Mirmirani, and P. A. Ioannou, "Adaptive Sliding Mode Control Design for a Hypersonic Flight Vehicle," AIAA Journal of Guidance, Control, and Dynamics, Vol 27, pp 829–838, September–October 2004.
P. A. Ioannou and K. S. Tsakalis, "A Robust Direct Adaptive Controller," IEEE Transactions on Automatic Control, Vol. 31, No. 11, November 1986.
P. A. Ioannou and P. V. Kokotovic, "Instability Analysis and Improvement of Robustness of Adaptive Systems," Automatica, Vol. 20, No. 5, September 1984, pp. 583–594
C. I. Liu, H. Jula, and P.A. Ioannou, “Design, simulation, and evaluation of automated container terminals,” IEEE Transactions on Intelligent Transportation Systems, vol. 3, no. 1, March 2002 pp. 12–27.
K. S. Tsakalis and P. A. Ioannou, "Adaptive Control of Linear Time-Varying Plants: A New Model Reference Controller Structure," IEEE Transactions on Automatic Control, Vol. 34, No. 10, pp. 1038–1047, October 1989.
H. Jula, A. Chassiakos, and P. Ioannou, “Port dynamic empty container reuse,” Transportation Research – Part E, Vol. 42, No. 1, pp. 43–60, Jan. 2006
Kahveci N. and P. Ioannou, ‘Adaptive steering control for uncertain ship dynamics and stability analysis’, Automatica, vol. 49, no. 3, pp. 685–697, March 2013
Vadim Butakov and Petros Ioannou "Driver/Vehicle Response Diagnostic System for the Vehicle Following Case," IEEE Transactions on Intelligent Transportation Systems, Vol.15, no.5, Oct. 2014, pp. 1947–1957
Y. Zhao and P. Ioannou, “Positive Train Control with Dynamic Headway Based on an Active Communication System", IEEE Transactions on Intelligent Transportation Systems, vol.16, no.6, pp. 3095–3103, Dec. 2015.
S. Jafari, P. A. Ioannou, and L. Rudd, "Adaptive Feedback Suppression of Unknown Periodic Components of Acoustic Noises with Time-Varying Characteristics," Journal of Vibration and Control, pp. 1–13, 2015. 
Yihang Zhang and Petros A. Ioannou, "Stability analysis and variable speed limit control of a traffic flow model," Transportation Research Part B: Methodological, 118, 31-65, 2018.

See also 
 Adaptive Cruise Control

References

External links 
 Home Page of Petros A. Ioannou at University of Southern California
 Center For Advanced Transportation Technologies CATT

American electrical engineers
American people of Cypriot descent
Alumni of University College London
Grainger College of Engineering alumni
University of Southern California faculty
Fellow Members of the IEEE
American systems scientists